The 1st Tennessee and Alabama Vidette Cavalry served in the Union Army between September 10, 1863, and June 16, 1864, during the American Civil War.

Service 
Companies "A", "B", "C", "G" and "H" were organized at Stevenson and Bridgeport, Alabama, between September 10, 1863, to June 16, 1864. Companies "D", "E" and "F", were organized at Tracy City and Nashville, Tennessee, between December 9, 1863, to February 24, 1864. The vidette cavalry participated in the skirmish at Hunt's Mills near Larkinsville, Alabama. They were a part of an expedition to Lebanon between December 12 and 29. Another skirmish at Sand Mountain, Alabama in Jackson County (Sand Mountain is large and goes from northern Alabama into Georgia), December 26. They were mustered out on June 16, 1864.

See also 

 List of Alabama Union Civil War regiments

References

Bibliography 
 Dyer, Frederick H. (1959). A Compendium of the War of the Rebellion. New York and London. Thomas Yoseloff, Publisher. .

Units and formations of the Union Army from Alabama
Units and formations of the Union Army from Tennessee
1865 disestablishments in Tennessee
Military units and formations established in 1863
1863 establishments in Alabama
Military units and formations disestablished in 1864